Kesariya Lok Sabha constituency was a Lok Sabha (parliamentary) constituency in Bihar state in eastern India till 1971.

Members of Parliament
1952: Jhulan Sinha, Indian National Congress ( as Saran North )
1957: Dwarka Nath Tiwary, Indian National Congress
1962: Bhishma Prasad Yadava, Indian National Congress
1967: Kamla Mishra Madhukar, Communist Party of India
1971: Kamla Mishra Madhukar, Communist Party of India
1977 onwards: Does not exist

See also
 Kesariya
 West Champaran district
 List of former constituencies of the Lok Sabha

Politics of West Champaran district
Former Lok Sabha constituencies of Bihar
Former constituencies of the Lok Sabha